Nicolas Georgiou (born February 24, 1976 in Cyprus) is a Cypriot former defender.

Career
Georgiou started his career at AEK Larnaca, before signing for AC Omonia in 1998. His last season at the club was in 2008, when he announced his retirement from the game at the age of 32.

External links
 

1976 births
Living people
Cypriot footballers
Cyprus international footballers
AC Omonia players
AEK Larnaca FC players
Association football defenders